Gong Shou Dao, also known as On That Night... While We Dream is a 2017 Chinese kung fu short film directed by Wen Zhang and produced by Jet Li. The film stars Jack Ma, Jet Li, Donnie Yen, Wu Jing, Tony Jaa, Jacky Heung, Asashōryū Akinori, Zou Shiming, and Natasha Liu Bordizzo. The film was released on November 11, 2017, during the Double 11 Shopping Carnival.

Plot
One day, Master Ma is walking down the street, suddenly he sees the words "Huashan Sect" hiding between the green grass. He closes his eyes and hence the duel with different martial artists masters begins.

Cast

 Jack Ma as Master Ma
 Jet Li as Old Servant
 Donnie Yen as Master Yen
 Wu Jing as Master Jing
 Tony Jaa as Master Jaa
 Jacky Heung as Master Zuo
 Asashōryū Akinori as Master Long
 Zou Shiming as Master Zou
 Natasha Liu Bordizzo as Master Yu
 Tong Dawei as Policeman Tong
 Mark Huang as Policeman Ming
 Li Chen as Policeman Chen
 Shao Xiaofeng as Police Inspector

Production
Wen Zhang was hired as the director. Yuen Woo-ping, Sammo Hung and Tony Ching were hired as choreographers. The film is Chinese e-commerce tycoon Jack Ma's debut.

Music
The theme song Feng Qing Yang is sung by singer Faye Wong and Jack Ma. The song’s title Feng Qing Yang is the name of a top martial artist in another one of Louis Cha's wuxia novels, The Smiling, Proud Wanderer.

Release
On October 28, 2017, Jack Ma released a poster in his Sina Weibo. The movie was released in China on November 11, 2017 and was watched 170 million times online in a couple months, according to Alibaba.

References

External links
 

2017 films
Chinese action films
Chinese short films
2017 martial arts films